4H may refer to:

4-H, a youth organization administered by the USDA
Curtiss JN-4H, an American biplane
4H, a Washington, D.C. Metrobus route, in the United States
4H-pyran
4H-SiC, one of the polymorphs of silicon carbide
Hydrogen-4 (4H, or quadrium), an isotope of hydrogen
4H, IATA code for United Airways, a Bangladeshi airline
4H disease, an early name for AIDS since the syndrome seemed to affect heroin users, homosexuals, hemophiliacs, and Haitians
4H, the production code for the 1975 Doctor Who serial Planet of Evil

See also
H4 (disambiguation)